Anders Göran Kulläng (23 September 1943 – 28 February 2012) was a rally and rallycross driver. His biggest success was to win the 1980 Swedish Rally.

Career
Kulläng began his rallying career in 1962. He competed in the first ever World Rally Championship round, the 1973 Monte Carlo Rally, in an Opel Ascona. He continued to compete on WRC rounds for Opel until 1981, including winning the 1980 Swedish Rally. During 1981, he became an official driver for Mitsubishi Ralliart.

Kulläng later ran his own rally school in Sweden. His pupils included Colin McRae and Sébastien Loeb.

WRC victories
{|class="wikitable"
! # 
!Event
!Season
!Co-driver
!Car
|-
|1
| 30th International Swedish Rally
|1980
|Bruno Berglund
|Opel Ascona 400
|}

Death
On 28 February 2012, Kulläng drowned whilst on vacation in Huay Yang, Thailand.

References

External links
Kulläng Driving School
World Rally Archive
Rallybase

1943 births
2012 deaths
World Rally Championship drivers
Swedish rally drivers
Deaths by drowning
Accidental deaths in Thailand
Sportspeople from Karlstad